Croy may refer to:

 Places
 in Scotland
Croy, Highland, Scotland
Croy Hill, The Roman fort on the Antonine Wall, Scotland
Croy, North Lanarkshire, Scotland
 Croy Line, a railway line linking Glasgow and Croy, North Lanarkshire
 Croy railway station, North Lanarkshire
Croy, South Ayrshire, Scotland
 in the rest of the world
Croy, Switzerland, a municipality in the Canton of Vaud
Croy Castle in the municipality Laarbeek, the Netherlands
 People
 Noble House of Croÿ, an important old family from Belgium
 Anne Croy, Canadian reproductive immunologist
 Homer Croy (1883–1965), American author and screenwriter
 John Croy (1925–1979), Scottish footballer
 Jürgen Croy (born 1946), former football goalkeeper for East Germany
 Martyn Croy (born 1974), New Zealand former cricketer
 Ricardo Croy (born 1986), South African rugby union player

See also
 Gordon Campbell, Baron Campbell of Croy (1921–2005), Scottish Conservative and Unionist politician.
 LeCroy Corporation, an American manufacturer of oscilloscopes, protocol analyzers and other test equipment
 Matthew LeCroy (born 1975), American former MLB player